EarthCam, Inc., based in Upper Saddle River, New Jersey, United States, provides webcam content, technology and services.  Founded in 1996, EarthCam.com is a network of scenic webcams offering a complete searchable database of views of places around the world.

As the company grew, EarthCam expanded beyond building its network of tourism cameras and extended its reach into other industries by developing and delivering technology for many applications in verticals including construction, transportation, and surveillance. Expanding beyond the pages of its main site, EarthCam.com, EarthCam's network of websites has grown to include WebCamStore.com, EarthCamMobile.com, and most notably EarthCam.net, a site for businesses and organizations to purchase webcams and EarthCam's proprietary software to manage their camera networks. Mobile applications for accessing EarthCam's live webcams and for clients to control their private cameras are available for Apple Inc. or Android (operating system) devices.

EarthCam and other live webcam services have a huge impact on entertainment and business, allowing for online "travel," meetings, and easy access to knowledge. Virtual travel also became possible with webcams located at major worldwide tourist attractions such as London's Abbey Road, the Eiffel Tower in Paris, Rio de Janeiro's Copacabana Beach, Hollywood Boulevard in Los Angeles and the "Welcome to Fabulous Las Vegas sign".

History
Brian Cury, CEO and founder of EarthCam, Inc., launched EarthCam.com in 1996 to build a network of webcams offering views of destinations throughout the world.

In 1999 it was claimed 20 people per day were adding their webcams to the website. By 2006 the website was a Webby Award Winner in the Tourism category. It is viewed by fans in 192 countries and ranks among the top 1% of all websites, according to Alexa.com.

One of the first highly publicised events that EarthCam produced, labelled "Webcast of the Century", featured celebrations from around the world at the turn of the new millennium on New Year's Eve 1999 / New Year's Day 2000. 100 cameras were located across the world, taking pictures every 30 seconds, viewed using an interactive world map on EarthCam.com.

In October 2011 EarthCam built and installed the 'TorchCams', custom camera systems that generate live video and widescreen images, giving visitors panoramic views from the Statue of Liberty torch, the location that has been closed to the public since 1916. The five cameras were donated to the National Park Service by EarthCam, Inc.

In May 2015, EarthCam announced that it had chosen Davis Brody Bond - Architect of the 9/11 Memorial Museum - to design its new 10-acre campus in Upper Saddle River, New Jersey.

To ring in the new year in 2017, EarthCam installed 4K live streaming video cameras in Times Square in order to broadcast the first-ever 4K stream of the Times Square celebration live on YouTube. Through the years, EarthCam’s streaming video quality has evolved, from still JPEG images updating once every 60 seconds in 1996 to 4K "ultra-high definition" streaming video today.

Website
EarthCam.net provides live streaming video, megapixel, wireless, and solar-powered camera systems, along with managed services, for corporate clients and government agencies worldwide, including the General Services Administration (GSA).  Powered by EarthCam's Control Center 8 webcam management service that is delivered as a user-controllable SaaS (Software as a Service) interface, EarthCam's professional webcam technology is used to view, document, and promote projects. Additional advanced imaging technology services are offered including gigapixel images and most recently, EarthCam Air, aerial photography which combines EarthCam’s webcam technology with Unmanned Aerial Vehicle (UAV) services to produce geospatial images.

By visiting EarthCam, viewers have the capability to see historical places and landmarks around the world, especially in the US.  EarthCam cameras located at the Martin Luther King Jr. Memorial in Washington DC, the Flight 93 National Memorial in Shanksville, PA, Seattle's Space Needle, Wall Street's notable Charging Bull and more deliver unique views, both live and archived.  The archived images can be edited together to produce time-lapse videos such as the Ground Zero 10-year time-lapse which was created from images captured at the site from September 2001 through September 2011.

Projects documented by EarthCam

 National September 11 Memorial & Museum
 The Panama Canal Expansion
 Smithsonian Institution
 San Francisco - Oakland Bay Bridge
 Madison Square Garden
 Hong Kong Disneyland
 Los Angeles International Airport
 Ivanpah Solar Generating Field (Ivanpah Solar Power Facility)
 Los Alamos National Laboratory
 Denver Union Station
 George W. Bush Presidential Library
 National Institutes of Health
 Guggenheim and Louvre Museums in Abu Dhabi
 New Levi's Stadium
 Barclays Center
 Dallas/Fort Worth International Airport
 Lake Champlain Bridge
 Perot Museum of Nature and Science
 OliverMcMillan
 Whitney Museum of American Art
 Akron Children's Hospital
 U.S. Bank Stadium
 Allegiant Stadium
 Daytona International Speedway
 National Museum of African American History and Culture
 Los Angeles Rams
 Milwaukee Bucks
 New Tappan Zee Bridge
 Jeddah Tower
 Golden State Warriors
 Mercedes-Benz Stadium
 Golden State Warriors
 San Francisco Museum of Modern Art
 56 Leonard Street
 Minnesota Vikings
 Duke University Medical Center
 Levi's Stadium
 MetLife Stadium
 Duke University Medical Center
 National Museum of African American History and Culture
 Daytona International Speedway
 University of Kentucky
Utica Zoo Cotton Top Tamarin Exhibit

References

External links
 EarthCam.com
  EarthCam.net

Webcams